Sarichef Island (Inupiaq: Qigiqtaq) is a long and narrow coastal island on the Chukchi Sea-facing coast of Alaska. It is located at the mouth of the Shishmaref Inlet, Kotzebue-Kobuk Low. It is located hundred miles east of Russia, which can be seen on clear days. The highest point on the island is the 6-meter cemetery in Shishmaref. The island is rapidly disappearing due to the sea level rise associated with global warming.

Shishmaref town and Shishmaref Airport are located on this island.

This island was named in 1816 by explorer Lt. Otto von Kotzebue, of the Imperial Russian Navy, "in the honor of his worthy" Vice Admiral Gavril Sarychev (1763–1831).

See also 
 Arctic shrinkage
 Sea Islands

References

External links 
USGS

Islands of Alaska
Islands of Nome Census Area, Alaska
Islands of the Chukchi Sea
Islands of Unorganized Borough, Alaska